Alex Brenninkmeijer (29 June 1951 – 14 April 2022)  was a Dutch lawyer, judge and academic, national ombudsman between 2005 and 2014, and member of the European Court of Auditors from 2014 until his death in 2022 in Luxembourg at the age of 70.

Biography
Alex Brenninkmeijer was born in Amsterdam, the Netherlands, in 1951. He studied Dutch law at the University of Groningen from 1971 to 1976, majoring in private law and public law and minoring in economics. In 1987, he obtained his doctorate from Tilburg University.

From 2005 to 2014, Brenninkmeijer served as the National Ombudsman of the Netherlands. He was a member of the ECA from 2014 until his death in April 2022.

References 

1951 births
2022 deaths
Ombudsmen
20th-century Dutch lawyers
Dutch legal scholars
Dutch civil servants
Academic staff of Leiden University
Academic staff of Utrecht University
Academic staff of the University of Amsterdam
21st-century Dutch judges